Billie Jean, Look At Me is the name of the soundtrack for the 2007 Korean drama Billie Jean, Look at Me starring Lee Ji-hoon and Park Hee-von.

Track 2 by Super Junior-K.R.Y. can also be found in SM Town's winter vacation album 2006 WINTER SMTOWN – Snow Dream.

Track listing
 Angels – Sunday The Grace (Rock Version)
 그것뿐이에요 (It's Just That) – Super Junior-K.R.Y.
 Dreaming – Lee Ji-hoon
 Out of Sight, Out of Mind – Dana
 Angels – TRAX (Ballad Version) 
 Angels – Instrumental (Rock Version) 
 영국 빌라 (English Villa)
 음흉한 방희씨 (Insidious Bang-hee) 
 암흑가의 아저씨들 (Men of the Underworld) – Tango Version 
 달려라 빌리 (Run, Billy) 
 싸움의 법칙  (Rules of Fighting) 
 Joyful Dayz? (Don't Let Me Down) 
 괴짜 방희  (Eccentric Bang-hee) 
 Walkin' With Billy (Ragtime) 
 Fury of Billy 
 늘 하고 싶던 이야기 (The Story I Always Wanted to Tell) 
 재미있는 이야기 (Fun Story) 
 나와 함께 춤을 (Your Dance with Me) 
 아름다운 방희 (Beautiful Bang-hee) 
 STRANGE MUSIC 1 & 2

Soundtracks by South Korean artists
2007 soundtrack albums
Television soundtracks
SM Entertainment soundtracks
K-pop albums
Rhythm and blues soundtracks
Rock soundtracks